Mozart! is an Austrian musical, originally written in German. The original book and lyrics were written by Michael Kunze and the music and arrangements were composed by Sylvester Levay. The show is a new imagining of the struggles of the famous composer.

The original production was directed by the opera director Harry Kupfer. It premiered on October 2, 1999, in the Theater an der Wien, and the final performance was on 7 May 2001. It ran for 419 performances, showing to approximately 420,000 patrons.

Productions
The production appealed especially to younger Viennese audiences. Subsequent productions have been mounted in:

 Germany: Neue Flora (Stage Entertainment), Hamburg (September 21, 2001 – June 30, 2002)
 Japan: Tokyo and Osaka (2002)
 Hungary: Budapest (2003)
 Sweden: Karlstad (2005)
 Japan: Osaka, Tokyo, Nagoya, Fukuoka (2005)
 Japan: Tokyo (2007)
 Germany: Zwickau, Plauen (2008)
 Czech Republic: Brno (2009)
 South Korea: Seoul (2010, 2011, 2012, 2014, 2016, 2020)
 Gwangju: (2010, 2014)
 Busan: (2010, 2014)
 Changwon: (2010, 2014)
 Daegu: (2010, 2014)
 Japan: Tokyo, Osaka, Kanazawa (2010-2011)
 Japan: Tokyo (2014)
 Austria: Vienna (2015)
 China: Shanghai (2016)
 Belgium: Antwerp (2017)
 Japan: Tokyo (2018)
 China: Beijing (2019)
 Hungary: Veszprém (2022)

Recordings
The Vienna and Budapest productions released cast albums, as well as the Japanese and Korean productions. In addition to that, the Korean production released two DVDs with a different cast on each. A DVD and a cast album have been released based on the 2015 Vienna production.

Chart positions

1999 musicals

References

External links
Website for Vienna concert
Cast and information about the musical from Budapest Operetta theatre
Stacy's Musical Village
A 2006 review in German

Biographical musicals
Cultural depictions of Wolfgang Amadeus Mozart
Musicals by Michael Kunze
Musicals by Sylvester Levay
Plays set in Austria
Wolfgang Amadeus Mozart in fiction